Six Shooter Records is an independent record label based in Toronto, Ontario, Canada, that uses an artist-centric business model, focusing on art before commerce combined with extensive touring. Six Shooter Records was founded in 2000 by Shauna de Cartier. The mission statement of the company is, Life is Too Short to Listen to Shitty Music.

In addition to production and sales of music, the company is involved in artist management, festival production, concert promotion and song publishing. The management arm of the company is run by de Cartier and partner Helen Britton. Notable festivals include the Interstellar Rodeo (Edmonton: 2012–2019 and Winnipeg: 2015-2017) and the Sleepwalker Guitar Festival (Toronto).

Several releases on Six Shooter Records have received awards and critical acclaim from music critics, including music from Canadian folk rock band Whitehorse, Canadian experimental vocalist Tanya Tagaq, Americana band The Deep Dark Woods, and country artist Whitney Rose.

Six Shooter Records is distributed by Universal Music in Canada, by Thirty Tigers and The Orchard outside of Canada.

Roster

Albums

See also

 List of record labels

Notes

External links
 Six Shooter Records official website

 
Record labels established in 2000
Canadian independent record labels
Indie rock record labels
Companies based in Toronto